The Boxer and the Spy (2008) is a crime novel for young adults by American author Robert B. Parker.

Plot summary
In a quiet New England town, the body of shy teenager Jason Green washes up on the shore, and the police soon claim that the death was a suicide induced by steroid addiction. However, Terry Novak, a fifteen-year-old aspiring boxer, is not so sure, especially considering that Jason was an artistic person who had no interest in sports and thus was not the type to be taking such drugs. Assisted by his friend Abby, he begins an investigation of his own, and soon learns that asking too many questions can lead him into serious danger.

External links
 The page on the book from Parker's official website

2008 American novels
American crime novels
American young adult novels
Novels about boxing
Novels by Robert B. Parker
Philomel Books books